Horizocerus is a genus of birds in the hornbill family, Bucerotidae, which are native to Africa.

Species

References 
 Gordon Lindsay Maclean - Robert's Birds of South Africa, 6th Edition

 
Bird genera
 
Taxa named by Harry C. Oberholser